The Malaysia Act 1963 (1963 C 35) was an Act of Parliament of the United Kingdom. It came into operation on 31 July 1963.

The Act made provisions for the federation of the States of North Borneo, Sarawak and Singapore with the existing States of the Federation of Malaya merge with the states of North Borneo, Sarawak and Singapore and the union was renamed Malaysia. As a result of the Act, the Federation of Malaya was renamed Malaysia on 16 September 1963.

Singapore ceased to be a state of Malaysia on 9 August 1965, becoming an independent state instead.

See also

 Malaysia Agreement was signed on 9 July 1963 at London
 British Nationality Act 1981
 British Overseas Territories Act 2002
 Constitution of Malaysia

References

External links

 The UK Statute Law Database:
 Malaysia Act 1963 (1963 C 35)
 Malaysia Act 1963
 Affecting the Malaysia Act 1963
Chronological table of the statutes; HMSO, London. 1993. 
 Agreement Relating to Malaysia between Governments of United Kingdom, Federation of Malaya, Crown Colony of North Borneo, Crown Colony of Sarawak and Singapore
 Hansard of Parliament of the United Kingdom Malaysia Bill

Formation of Malaysia
History of Malaysia
1963 establishments in Malaysia
United Kingdom Acts of Parliament 1963
1963 in Malaysia
Malaysia–United Kingdom relations
History of North Borneo
History of Sarawak
1963 in the British Empire
Malaysia and the Commonwealth of Nations
United Kingdom and the Commonwealth of Nations